Castelnovo Monti (officially Castelnovo ne' Monti; locally ) is a town and comune in the province of Reggio Emilia, central Italy.

Along with every other town and village in the Apennines, Castelnovo is an approved area for the production of Parmesan cheese. It is also home to the only hospital in the area.

Geography
It is situated in the Reggiano Apennines mountains.

Castelnovo is best known for the Pietra di Bismantova spur. The rock is a favourite climbing and abseiling destination throughout Italy and is considered a particularly difficult climb due to its outward-curving wall. The rock was mentioned by the Italian poet Dante Alighieri in the Divine Comedy.

Other geographical landmarks include the Triassic chalk formations of the Gessi Triassici and the river Secchia which, together with the Pietra of Bismantova, are part of the National Park of the Appennino Tosco-Emiliano.

Frazioni
Bellaria, Bellessere, Berzana, Bondolo, Bora del Musso, Burano, Ca' del Cavo, Ca' del Grosso, Ca' di Magnano, Ca' di Scatola, Campolungo, Capanna, Ca' Pavoni, Carnola, Casa della Carità, Casale, Case di Sopra, Case Perizzi, Casino, Castagnedolo, Cerreto, Chiesa, Cinqueterre, Colombaia, Costa de' Grassi, Croce, Eremo Bismantova, Fariolo, Felina, Felinamata, Frascaro, Garfagnolo, Gatta, Gombio, Maro, Monchio, Monchio di Villaberza, Monte Castagneto, Monteduro, Monticello, Mozzola, Noce, Parisola, Pietrebianche, Pioppella, Pregheffio, Quarqua, Regnola, Rio, Rivolvecchio, Roncadelli, Ronchi, Roncroffio, Schiezza, Soraggio, Terminaccio, Vezzolo, Vigolo, Virola, Vologno di Sotto, Zugognago.

Transportation
Castelnovo is connected to Reggio Emilia by a bus service run by ACT. Roads include SS 63 State road (to Reggio), the SS 513 state road (to the province of Parma), and the SP 7 and SP 15 provincial roads (to the province of Modena).

Twin towns
Castelnovo ne' Monti is twinned with:

  Fivizzano, Italy
  Illingen, Baden-Württemberg, Germany
  Voreppe, France

References

External links
 Official website 

Cities and towns in Emilia-Romagna